Metro North West Line is a rapid transit rail line in Sydney, New South Wales, Australia.

The line will be extended through the Sydney central business district and towards Bankstown with 18 more stations, as part of the Sydney Metro City & Southwest project, with an opening date of 2024.

Construction

The North West Line is being constructed in two stages. The current section was completed in May 2019 under the Sydney Metro Northwest project, which involved the construction of an entirely new line between Tallawong and Epping, along with the conversion of the Epping to Chatswood railway line which previously operated under suburban Sydney Trains services. The second stage, the Sydney Metro City & Southwest, is currently under construction and involves extending this line from Chatswood to Bankstown, similarly involving a combination of constructing a new line from Chatswood to Sydenham and converting a section of the Bankstown railway line from Sydenham to Bankstown, which previously operated as the suburban T3 Bankstown Line under Sydney Trains.

Service

Services on the line are operated by Metro Trains Sydney, a joint venture between the MTR Corporation, John Holland and UGL Rail. Services take 37 minutes to traverse the current 13 stations from end to end, at a frequency at each station of every four minutes during peak hours and every ten minutes in the off peak. Upon initial opening, the line previously operated at a frequency at each station of every five minutes during peak hours.

North West Night Bus
In the first six months of operations, regular metro services on the line were supplemented by a late night bus service known as the North West Night Bus, with 13 stops in close proximity to these stations. The bus service operated from Sunday to Wednesday nights after about 9.30 pm in both directions, filling in for final metro services at 10.05 pm from Chatswood and 9.25 pm from Tallawong, charging metro fares and operating at a frequency of every ten minutes. This service was temporary and was withdrawn six months later on 5 November 2019, when the metro reached full operations. The bus service was jointly operated by Transdev NSW and Hillsbus, both of whom previously jointly operated the Station Link services between September 2018 and May 2019.

Stations

References

External links 
 Metro North West Line at Transport for NSW

Sydney Metro
Rapid transit lines
Railway lines opened in 2019
2019 establishments in Australia